Peasant foods are dishes eaten by peasants, made from accessible and inexpensive ingredients.

In many historical periods, peasant foods have been stigmatized.

They may use ingredients, such as offal and less-tender cuts of meat, which are not as marketable as a cash crop. One-dish meals are common.

Common types

Meat-and-grain sausages or mushes

Ground meat or meat scraps mixed with grain in approximately equal proportions, then often formed into a loaf, sliced, and fried 
 Balkenbrij
 Black pudding
 Boudin
 Goetta, a pork or pork-and-beef and pinhead oats sausage
 Groaty pudding
 Haggis, a savory dish containing sheep's pluck (heart, liver, and lungs), minced with onion, oatmeal, suet, spices, and salt, mixed with stock, and cooked while encased in a sheep's stomach
 Knipp
 Livermush
 Lorne sausage
 Meatloaf
 Scrapple, pig scraps, cornmeal and other flours and spices fried together in a mush
 Slatur

Pasta
 Pasta con i peperoni cruschi, an Italian pasta dish from Basilicata, defined a true representative of "cucina povera" (peasant cooking)
 Pasta mollicata, Italian pasta dish from South Italy, especially Basilicata, often known as a "poor man's dish".
 Testaroli

Sauces

 Agliata – a garlic sauce in Italian cuisine that has been a peasant food, and also used by upper-class people

Soups and stews
 Acquacotta, an Italian soup that dates to ancient history. Primary ingredients are water, stale bread, onion, tomato and olive oil, along with various vegetables and leftover foods that may have been available.
 Batchoy (Tagalog), a Filipino meat soup or noodle soup made with pork and pork offal in ginger-flavored broth, traditionally with pork blood added.
 Cassoulet, a French bean, meat, and vegetable stew originating from the rural Southwest that has since become a staple of French cuisine
Cawl, a Welsh broth or soup

 Cholent, a traditional Jewish Sabbath stew
 Chupe, refers to a variety of stews from South America generally made with chicken, red meat, lamb or beef tripe and other offal
 Duckefett, a German sauce
 Dinuguan, a Filipino Pork Blood Stew infused with vinegar.
 Feijoada, originally a Portuguese stew consisting of beans and meat; also a Brazilian dish originally made by slaves from leftover ingredients from their master's house
 Gazpacho, typically a tomato-based vegetable soup, traditionally served cold, originating in the southern Spanish region of Andalusia.
 Minestrone, the meal in one pot of ancient Italy that is still a basic part of Italian cuisine
 Mulligan stew, a stew often made by itinerant workers
 Mujaddara, an Arabian dish of lentils, rice, grains, and onions
 Pea soup or "pease pudding", a common thick soup, from when dried peas were a very common food in Europe, still widely eaten there and in French Canada
 Pot-au-feu, the French stew of oxtail, marrow, and vegetables, sometimes sausage
 Pottage, a staple stew made from boiling vegetables, grains and whatever was available, since Neolithic times in the British Isles
 Ratatouille, a French stewed vegetable dish
 Shchi, a traditional Russian soup made from cabbage, meat, mushrooms, flour and sour cream, usually eaten with rye bread
Scouse (food), a stew type dish from Liverpool, which gives its name to the residents of the city, who are known as scousers.
Zatiruha, an Eastern European soup

List of Peasant foods

 Baked beans, the simple stewed bean dish
 Barbacoa, a form of slow cooking, often of an animal head, a predecessor to barbecue
 Bulgur wheat, with vegetables or meat
 Broken rice, which is often cheaper than whole grains and cooks more quickly.
 Bubble and squeak, a simple British dish, cooked and fried with potatoes and cabbage mixed together.
 Ragi balls made from Ragi flour which is boiled with water and balls are formed and eaten with vegetable gravy.
 Greens, such as dandelion and collard.
 Head cheese, made from boiling down the cleaned-out head of an animal to make broth, still made
 Hominy, a form of corn specially prepared to be more nutritious
 Horsebread, a low-cost European bread that was a recourse of the poor
 Katemeshi, a Japanese peasant food consisting of rice, barley, millet and chopped daikon radish
 Lampredotto, Florentine dish or sandwich made from a cow's fourth stomach
 Polenta, a porridge made with the corn left to Italian farmers so that land holders could sell all the wheat crops, still a popular food
 Pumpernickel, a traditional dark rye bread of Germany, made with a long, slow (16–24 hours) steam-baking process, and a sour culture
 Ratatouille, the stewed vegetable dish
 Red beans and rice, the Louisiana Creole dish made with red beans, vegetables, spices, and leftover pork bones slowly cooked together, and served over rice, common on Mondays when working women were hand-washing clothes
 Salami, a long-lasting sausage, used to supplement a meat-deficient diet
 Soul food, developed by African-American slaves and servants, primarily using ingredients undesired and given away by their employers or slaveholders.
 Succotash, a blend of corn and beans
 Taco, foods placed on native tortillas in the Americas

See also

 Famine food, foods turned to in times of crisis, sometimes across whole societies
 Farm-to-table
 Slow Food, a social movement inspired by home cooking and regional tradition as an alternative to fast food
 Social class
 Traditional knowledge

References

Further reading
 Bryceson, Deborah Fahy (1978). Peasant Food Production and Food Supply in Relation to the Historical Development of Commodity Production in Pre-colonial and Colonial Tanganyika. Service paper / University of Dar es Salaam. Bureau of resource assessment and land use planning. 72 pages.
 Dyer, Christopher (1989). Standards of Living in the Later Middle Ages: Social Change in England C.1200-1520. Cambridge University Press. Chapter 6. pp. 151- . 
 Brierley, John S.; Rubenstein, Hymie (1988). Small farming and peasant resources in the Caribbean. Dept. of Geography, University of Manitoba. Volume 10 of Manitoba geographical studies. Chapter 1.
 Fieldhouse, D.K. (2012). Black Africa 1945-1980: Economic Decolonization and Arrested Development. Routledge p. 146.

External links
 Dietary Requirements of a Medieval Peasant. People.eku.edu.
 Polish Peasant Food for Beginners

Cuisine
Feudalism
Peasants